Sergey Gennadyevich Obukhov (born June 29, 1974) is a Russian professional bandy player from Kirov, who in the 2018-19 season is captain for Dynamo-Kazan. He has scored more goals than any other Russian player. Obukhov has played many games for the Russian national bandy team and was top scorer at the 2005 and 2007 Bandy World Championship (in 2005, Vyacheslav Bronnikov of Kazakhstan made an equal number of points, but Obukhov scored more goals than Bronnikov). Obukhov has been an important member of both club and country. In 2007 he won the Bandy World Cup, Champions Cup, Russian League Cup with Dynamo Moscow and the Bandy World Championship with Russia.

Career
Obukhov made his senior debut for Rodina in the 1990–91 season. In 1995–96, he joined Falu BS and represented them until 2002 and was awarded the Swedish Player of the Year in 2001. He later played for Vodnik, Dynamo Moscow, and Dynamo-Kazan. After playing some years again in Rodina, in 2017 he rejoined Dynamo-Kazan.

References

External links
 

1974 births
Living people
Russian bandy players
Rodina Kirov players
Falu BS players
Vodnik Arkhangelsk players
Dynamo Moscow players
Dynamo Kazan players
Russian Bandy Super League players
Expatriate bandy players in Sweden
Sportspeople from Kirov, Kirov Oblast